Nestucca Bay is a bay formed by the confluence of the Nestucca River and the Pacific Ocean in northwest Oregon in the United States. The bay is a bar-built estuary and totals  in area.

The Nestucca and Little Nestucca rivers enter the bay. The bay is separated from the Pacific Ocean by the Nestucca Spit which includes Bob Straub State Park. A part of Nestucca Bay is included in the Nestucca Bay National Wildlife Refuge.

References

External links
 
 

Bays of Oregon
Oregon Coast
Bodies of water of Tillamook County, Oregon